Center Township is one of the fourteen townships of Morgan County, Ohio, United States.  The 2000 census found 652 people in the township.

Geography
Located in the eastern part of the county, it borders the following townships:
Manchester Township - north
Sharon Township, Noble County - northeast
Jackson Township, Noble County - east
Adams Township, Washington County - southeast corner
Waterford Township, Washington County - south
Windsor Township - southwest
Meigsville Township - west
Bristol Township - northwest corner

Despite its name, Center Township is not in the center of Morgan County; it is located farther east than any other township in the county.

The unincorporated settlement of Hackney is located in the center of Center Township.

Name and history
It is one of nine Center Townships statewide.

Government
The township is governed by a three-member board of trustees, who are elected in November of odd-numbered years to a four-year term beginning on the following January 1. Two are elected in the year after the presidential election and one is elected in the year before it. There is also an elected township fiscal officer, who serves a four-year term beginning on April 1 of the year after the election, which is held in November of the year before the presidential election. Vacancies in the fiscal officership or on the board of trustees are filled by the remaining trustees.

As of 2018, the trustees are Alva Heiss, Thomas Brothers, and Neil McKown, and the clerk is Tammy Hall.

References

External links
County website

Townships in Morgan County, Ohio
Townships in Ohio